Krismon Gustap Wombaibobo (born 16 May 1998) is an Indonesian professional footballer who plays as a midfielder for Liga 2 club PSBS Biak.

Club career

Yahukimo
He was signed for Yahukimo to play in Liga 2 on 2017.

Persewar Waropen
Krismon joined the Persewar Waropen club in the 2018. Krismon scored 4 goals in the 2019 season when Persewar played in the second division.

Badak Lampung
Krismon joined the Badak Lampung club in the 2020 and made his debut on 15 March 2020 in a match against PSKC Cimahi. This season was suspended on 27 March 2020 due to the COVID-19 pandemic. The season was abandoned and was declared void on 20 January 2021.

Semen Padang
In 2021, Krismon signed a contract with Indonesian Liga 2 club Semen Padang. He made his league debut on 6 October against PSPS Riau at the Gelora Sriwijaya Stadium, Palembang.

References

External links 
 Krismon Wombaibobo Liga Indonesia

1998 births
Living people
Badak Lampung F.C. players
Persewar Waropen players
Yahukimo F.C. players
Indonesian footballers
Liga 2 (Indonesia) players
Association football midfielders